{{Infobox national football team
| Name              = Yemen
| Badge             = Flag of Yemen.svg
| Badge_size        = 190px
| Nickname          = Al-Yaman As-Sa'eed  (The Happy Yemen)  (اليمن السعيد)  Al-'Arab Al-Qahtaniyya  (The Qahtanite Arabs)  (العرب القحطانية)  Nusoor Saba  (The Eagles of Sheba)  (نسور سبأ) 
| Association       = Yemen Football Association
| Sub-confederation = WAFF (West Asia)
| Confederation     = AFC (Asia)
| Coach             =  Miroslav Soukup
| Asst Manager      = Amin Al-Sanini
| Captain           = Mudir Abdurabu
| Most caps        =  Ala Al-Sasi (72)
| Top scorer        = Ali Al-Nono (29)
| Home Stadium      = Althawra Sports City Stadium
| FIFA Trigramme    = YEM 
| FIFA Rank         = 
| FIFA max          = 90
| FIFA max date     = August – September 1993, November 1993
| FIFA min          = 186
| FIFA min date     = February 2014
| Elo Rank          = 
| Elo max           = 117
| Elo max date      = 7 November 2010
| Elo min           = 169
| Elo min date      = September 2015
| pattern_la1       = _jakoprimera22rw
| pattern_b1        = _jakoprimera22rw
| pattern_ra1       = _jakoprimera22rw
| pattern_sh1       = 
| pattern_so1       = 
| leftarm1          = FF0000
| body1             = FF0000
| rightarm1         = FF0000
| shorts1           = FFFFFF
| socks1            = 000000
| pattern_la2       = _jakoprimera22wb
| pattern_b2        = _jakoprimera22wb
| pattern_ra2       = _jakoprimera22wb
| pattern_sh2       = 
| pattern_so2       = 
| leftarm2          = FFFFFF
| body2             = FFFFFF
| rightarm2         = FFFFFF
| shorts2           = FFFFFF
| socks2            = FFFFFF
| First game        =
 4–1   (Baghdad, Iraq; 2 April 1966)as Yemen 0–1   (Kuala Lumpur, Malaysia; 8 September 1990)
| Largest win        = 
  2–1   (Casablanca, Morocco; 11 August 1985) 1–0   (Abu Dhabi, United Arab Emirates; 11 February 1988)as Yemen 11–2   (Kuwait City, Kuwait; 18 February 2000)
| Largest loss       = 
 7–0   (Jeddah, Saudi Arabia; 6 October 2003)
| Regional name      = Asian Cup
| Regional cup apps  = 1 
| Regional cup first = 2019
| Regional cup best  = Group stage (2019)
| 2ndRegional name      = WAFF Championship
| 2ndRegional cup apps  = 3
| 2ndRegional cup first = 2010
| 2ndRegional cup best  = Semifinals (2010)
}}

The Yemen national football team, is the national team of Yemen and is controlled by the Yemen Football Association.

When the nation was split into North Yemen and South Yemen before 1990, two national teams existed. After unification, the Yemen national football team is considered the successor of the North Yemen national football team. See the article South Yemen national football team for details on the South Yemen team.

Despite being the 5th most populated country in the Middle East, and Yemen's successes at the Youth teams such as the U23, U20 and U17 Yemen, so far, Yemen has never achieved the same success as those with smaller populations like the United Arab Emirates, Qatar, Syria, Jordan and Oman.

Early history

1965–1966
North Yemen debuted at the 1965 Pan Arab Games in Cairo, Egypt in August 1965. It lost the first game 9–0 to Sudan, then lost 16–1 to Libya. After losing 4–0 to Syria, North Yemen won for the first time by defeating Oman 2–1 in the last game in the group. North Yemen did not advance.

In April 1966, the team entered the 1966 Arab Cup in Baghdad, Iraq. It was placed in Group 2. North Yemen lost its first match 4–1 to Syria on 1 April, and then 7–0 to Palestine three days later. On 5 April, they lost their last match 13–0 to Libya, and were eliminated, finishing bottom of the group.

Also in 1966, North Yemen entered the Games of the Emerging Forces in Cambodia. They lost their opener 5–3 against Palestine.

1984–1989
Following the tournament in Cambodia, North Yemen did not play a match for eighteen years, returning in 1984 in an attempt to qualify to the 1984 Asian Cup. This was their first entrance of the competition. They were placed at the qualifiers in Group 3 with all matches held in Calcutta, India in October 1984. North Yemen lost the first match on 10 October, 6–0 to South Korea, for whom Park Sung-Hwa scored four goals and Chung Hae-Won two. Two days later, they lost 2–0 to hosts India. On 15 October North Yemen lost 4–1 to Pakistan and three days later by the same score to Malaysia. North Yemen finished at the bottom of the group.

North Yemen entered its first World Cup qualification campaign with the aim of securing a place in the 1986 World Cup in Mexico. They were placed in Group 3 of the West Asia zone in the first round of the qualification campaign. North Yemen played their first match at home to Syria in Sana'a on 29 March 1985 and lost 1–0 to a 70th-minute goal. On 5 April, they lost 5–0 to Kuwait in Kuwait City. On 19 April, North Yemen lost 3–0 away to Syria at the Abbasiyyin Stadium in Damascus. On 26 April, while hosting Kuwait, North Yemen scored their only goal in the group as they lost 3–1 in front of 10,000 people.

In August 1985, North Yemen competed at the 1985 Pan Arab Games in Rabat, Morocco and was placed in a group with Saudi Arabia, Algeria and the United Arab Emirates. They lost 2–0 to the Saudis on 5 August, 3–1 to Algeria on 7 August, and then, on 9 August, beat the UAE 2–1 for their first ever victory.

On 15 October 1985, North Yemen played opposition from outside Asia and Africa for the first time, losing a friendly 2–0 to Mexico at home. The game against Mexico was regarded historic, as Mexico was host of the 1986 FIFA World Cup.

Reunification of the North and South

1990s
In the 1990, the North and South of Yemen re-united which prompted what is now the national team of Yemen to be merged from North Yemen. Their first international game, as a unified country, was a 1–0 win against Malaysia on 8 September 1990 in Kuala Lumpur.

Upon being a new country, they entered the footballing world with a different viewpoint. Their captains alternated between matches to promote a "unified" Yemen. Due to the ongoing political conflict in Yemen, many sought football as an escape.

Starting in 1993, their first big task would be the qualification to the 1994 FIFA World Cup, because they did not enter the AFC Asian Cup in 1992, nor the Arab Cup. Yemen lost three games, against China once, and Iraq twice. They drew with Jordan twice, and won against China and Pakistan. This placed them third, five points from Iraq who were first, and ultimately ended their first ever World Cup qualification campaign.

The qualification campaign for the 1996 Asian Cup saw them get thrashed by Saudi Arabia as they lost 4–0 in the first leg, but put a fight in the second leg as they lost 1–0. Despite finishing last, on points with Kyrgyzstan, Yemen's only redeeming event was the narrow 1–0 win against Kyrgyzstan, despite getting beat 3–1 in the return leg.

More years went by as Yemen continued to struggle as a footballing power, not only in Asia, but in the Middle East. The qualification campaign for the 1998 World Cup raised some spirits as they came in second above Indonesia and Cambodia. For the Yemenis, this was an ample progress as Uzbekistan, with 16 points, had stomped the first stage with having twice as many points as second-place Yemen at 8 points. While adding on to the fact that Yemen lost 1–0 to Uzbekistan, and despite losing 5–1 in the return leg, this gave the Yemenis a hopeful future for the upcoming tournaments.

2000s
Yemen started the millennium by attempting to qualify for the 2000 AFC Asian Cup. The Al-Yemen A'Sa'eed started off the year with a resounding 3–0 win against Nepal following with a narrow 0–1 loss to Turkmenistan. After this, it came to light that Kuwait had thrashed Bhutan 20–0 in the qualifiers which prompted doubt in the national team. Needless to say, Yemen only lost 2–0 to Kuwait (with an own-goal added) and ended the qualification campaign with their highest win as they stomped Bhutan 11–2 with Ali Al Nono bagging a hat-trick and three others netting braces. These matches put Yemen at 6 points finishing above Nepal and Bhutan at third place of fifth.

The following year, in 2001, would be a high-point for the Yemeni fans as they watched their national team barely lose out on the advancement of the second round of the qualification campaign of the 2002 FIFA World Cup. They lost to United Arab Emirates who finished at top with 12 points while Yemen, along with India, sat at 11 points with Yemen scoring three more goals than India, despite the same goal-difference of six. Losing narrowly, in both legs, to the Arab powerhouse that was United Arab Emirates, the Yemeni fans held their heads high knowing that the football in Yemen was slowly developing.

However, for the Yemenis, disappointment would strike as they bombed their next big competition, the 2002 Arab Cup. This would be their first appearance since 1966 when they played as North Yemen, in which they also failed losing all three games and having a goal difference of −23. In 2012, it would be a different story as they drew 2–2 with Asian powerhouse Saudi Arabia but losing to  Lebanon 4–2, Bahrain 3–1 and Syria 0–4.

The qualification for the 2004 AFC Asian Cup would arrive as the next test for Yemen. The Yemenis would soon discover that this qualification was going better than expected. However, as fate would have it, the Yemenis were left stranded on the cusp of qualification as they were beat to the last spot by Indonesia by 3 points, despite them having a worse goal difference.

Days later, they would face yet another big tournament in quick succession which was the 16th Arabian Gulf Cup hosted by Kuwait. This tournament did not do them any favors as they came in dead last out of seventh. They finished with 1 point, drawing with Oman and a goal difference of −16. But within a few months, the 17th Arabian Gulf Cup arrived with the Yemenis waiting for their revenge for a poor showing in the previous tournament. However, the Yemenis once again, to everyone's expectations, failed to register a win with the only point coming from a 1–1 draw to Bahrain while losing 0–3 to Saudi Arabia and 3–1 to Kuwait.

Yemen would next look towards the qualification campaign of the 2006 FIFA World Cup. But the Yemenis would soon end it on a short note, as they finished bottom of the group with 5 points under Thailand, United Arab Emirates and North Korea (who won the group with 11 points) and one win, two draws and three losses.

A short time later would find the Yemenis preparing for the 18th Arabian Gulf Cup. Despite, as expected, finishing the group last, they finished with two losses against United Arab Emirates and Oman and the lone draw to Kuwait. However, the Yemenis would exit proudly because they did not receive the thrashing many were expecting and lost due to a 1-goal margin with the winning goals coming the second half.

Months later would see Yemen enter the qualification campaign of the 2007 AFC Asian Cup and were knocked out, once again, with mixed results. While Japan and Saudi Arabia qualified comfortably, Yemen achieved their only two wins against India. However, their losses to Japan were minimal as both goals (consolation and winning) came in stoppage time.

2010s
 
The next task for the Yemenis was the qualification campaign for the 2010 World Cup which was cut shorter than usual. In the first round, Yemen scored three goals without reply against Maldives, in the first leg. In the return leg, Maldives replied with two goals but in the end, it was not enough, and Yemen passed to the next stage. The second stage saw Yemen draw 1–1 with Thailand with the second leg finishing 1–0 in favor to Thailand thus knocking them out 3–2 on aggregate. This was the first time Yemen did not reach the group stages of a World Cup qualification stage.

Yemen started off the new year by hosting the 20th Arabian Gulf Cup for the first time. As hosts, they played in the May 22 Stadium in Aden against Saudi Arabia and lost 0–4. Yemen would go on and lose 2–1 and 0–3 to Qatar and Kuwait respectively thus crashing out of the group stages only scoring one goal while conceding nine.

The qualification campaign for the 2011 Asian Cup was acceptable for Yemeni' standards. Despite being grouped with Japan and Bahrain, and Hong Kong, they achieved two wins, one draw and three losses. They opened with a surprise narrow-defeat of 2–1 to Japan and finished with the surprise of, once again, holding Japan to the last minute for a 3–2 defeat.

Ten years later of their last participation, they entered the 2012 Arab Cup where they were grouped with Morocco, Bahrain and Libya. To the bewilderment of many football experts, Bahrain finished last with Yemen finishing third with three points.

However, in 2013, Yemen would participate in the 21st Arabian Gulf Cup, and they would record their worst run in the tournament where they were grouped with Kuwait, Saudi Arabia, and Iraq. They didn't record any goal and conceded six goals losing all three games.

As recent record showed, the Yemenis finished with their worst World Cup qualification campaign for the 2014 World Cup. They faced Iraq which they lost 2–0. The return leg was played in the United Arab Emirates due to the civil unrest in Yemen. This match saw Yemen and Iraq play out to a draw which ended Iraq going through 2–0 on aggregate and thus knocking Yemen out in the knock-out stages.

In December 2013, they sunk to their lowest rank ever on the FIFA rankings at 179th. From the start of January 2013 to December 2013, they lost half of what they had previously, going down nearly 50 points. This calling came for the Yemen Football Association to make a serious signing, when they signed Vladimir Petrović as the coach who had experience in Europe as a player and of Red Star Belgrade fame. Unfortunately, due to his contract extending for just a year, Vladmir Petrović quit as Yemen's manager in May 2014. Because of this, Yemen dropped to their lowest and worst in Yemen's football: 186th. In preparation for the 22nd Arabian Gulf Cup, they hired Czech youth teams' manager Miroslav Soukup to attempt to revive the national team. Once again, Yemen was eliminated without winning a match, but for the first time in their Gulf Cup history, they didn't finish last.

The 2018 FIFA World Cup qualification happened with the outbreak of the civil war, leaving majority of the national team's players and staff to escape to Djibouti by boat, which made headline by the media. Yemen only managed to defeat two opponents, Pakistan and the Philippines, while they lost to other opponents, thus Yemen ended their qualification with bottom record. However, since the failure, Yemen has begun their resurgence. During the 2019 AFC Asian Cup qualification, which was the first attempt of Yemen to qualify to the tournament as an unified nation, Yemen has defeated Tajikistan, while maintaining other draws. Yemen had a big chance to qualify to its first international tournament in its history as a unified country. Finally, with the help from the Philippines when the Azkals defeated Tajikistan 2–1 in Manila, Yemen had finally qualified to the Asian Cup for the first time in its history.

In the team's maiden AFC Asian Cup, Yemen was grouped with Iraq, Iran and Vietnam. Their opening campaign was against Iran, which participated in the previous 2018 World Cup and had almost eliminated Spain in progress. Yemen played well in the first ten minutes and almost scored a goal, but aftermath saw Iran completely dominated Yemen and the Yemenis lost 0–5 to Iran. Yemen later fell to Iraq 0–3 after being unable to repel Iraqi pressure, and later lost to Southeast Asian opponent Vietnam 0–2 and finished last with no goal and no point. Both three opponents of Yemen would soon progress from the group stage.

Yemen later participated in the 2019 WAFF Championship where they were grouped with host Iraq, Palestine, Syria and Lebanon. The Yemeni side was eliminated from the group stage this time, but they managed to finish in third place, even above Lebanon and Syria, thanked for a 2–1 over the former and a 1–1 draw to the latter. Despite this, Yemen once again failed in the 24th Arabian Gulf Cup, scoring no goal and conceded nine, but the Yemenis successfully gained a goalless draw to Iraq to win its first major point since 2014 edition.

Between these competitions, Yemen participated in the 2022 FIFA World Cup qualification – AFC Second Round where they were grouped with Uzbekistan, minnows Singapore and fellow Arab rivals Saudi Arabia and Palestine. During their first games, Yemen got two points after two 2–2 draws over minnows Singapore away and more importantly, the encouraging draw to powerhouse Saudi Arabia in Bahrain, with the Yemenis taking the lead twice, to end their losing streak to Saudi Arabia since 2002. Yet, Yemen slumped later after receiving a 0–5 demolition from Uzbekistan, before beating Palestine 1–0 to gain its first major win in this qualification round. However, disappointment would soon return when Yemen suffered a heartbreaking loss to Singapore 1–2 and put its qualification at risk.

Recent results and forthcoming fixtures

2022

2023

 Coaching staff 

Managerial history
Caretaker managers are listed in italics

 Zaki Osman (1970)
 Alan Gillett (1977)
 Timur Segizbayev (1979–1982)
 Dr. Azzam Khalifa 1 (1989–1990)
 Luciano de Abreu (1993–1994)
 Ali Saleh Abad (1996)
 Omar Bashami (1996)
 Mojahed Al Saraha (1997)
 Hazem Jassam (1997)
 Salem Abdel Rahman (1997)
 Hazem Jassam (1997–1999)
 Roberto Fernandes (1999)
 Zoran Đorđević (1999–2000)
 Luciano de Abreu (2000–2002)
 Mahmoud Abou-Regaila (2002)
 Torsten Spittler 2 (2002)
 Abdullah Saqr Baamer 3 (2002)
 Hazem Jassam (2002–2003)
 Ahmed Ali Qasem (2003)
 Milan Živadinović (2003–2004)
 Amine Al-Sunaini (2004) 
 Rabah Saâdane (2004–2005)
 Ahmed Alraay (2006)
 Mohsen Saleh (2006–2009)
 Hamza Al Jamal (2009)
 Sami Hasan Al Nash (2009)
 Srećko Juričić (2009–2010)
 Amine Al-Sunaini (2010–2012) 
 Sami Hasan Al Nash (2012)
 Tom Saintfiet (2012–2013)
 Sami Hasan Al Nash (2013)
 Vladimir Petrović (2013–2014)
 Miroslav Soukup (2014–2015)
 Amine Al-Sunaini (2015–2016) 
 Ahmed Ali Qasem (2016)
 Abraham Mebratu (2016–2018)
 Ján Kocian (2018–2019)
 Sami Hasan Al Nash (2019–2021)
 Ahmed Ali Qasem (2021)
 Nenad Nikolić (2021–2022)
 Amin Al-Sanini (2022)
 Adel Amrouche (2022)
 Miroslav Soukup (2022–2023) 

Notes
Dr. Azzam Khalifa served as the first coach of the unified Yemen football team.
Torsten Spittler, the youth national team coach, was selected by the YFA to take charge of the team at the 2002 Arab Cup with a squad composed of youth team and senior players. However, after one friendly match, the FA overturned this decision and appointed Hazem Jassam instead.
Abdullah Saqr Baamer served as caretaker coach during the 2002 Arab Cup due to coach Hazem Jassam being unable to obtain a visa as he was blacklisted by the host nation of Kuwait.

 Players 
 Current squad 
 The following players were called up for the 25th Arabian Gulf Cup matches.
 Match dates: 6 – 19 January 2023
 Opposition: ,  and 
 Caps and goals correct as of: 14 June 2022, after the match against 

 Recent call-ups
The following list of players were also called up within the last twelve months.

Former squads
2012 Arab Cup squads

RecordsPlayers in bold are still active with Yemen.''

Most appearances

Top goalscorers

Competition records

World Cup record

AFC Asian Cup record

Asian Games record

Gulf Cup record

Arab Cup record

Pan Arab Games record

WAFF Championship

Palestine Cup of Nations

Head-to-head record

See also
 Yemen women's national football team
 North Yemen national football team
 South Yemen national football team
 Yemen national football team results
 Yemen national under-17 football team
 Yemen national under-20 football team
 Yemen national under-23 football team

References

External links

 Yemen on FIFA 
Official site 
 List of players 

 

 
Asian national association football teams